Chuvashia may refer to:
Chuvash Republic, a federal subject of Russia
Chuvash Autonomous Oblast (1920–1925), an administrative division of the Russian SFSR
Chuvash Autonomous Soviet Socialist Republic (1925–1992), an administrative division of the Russian SSR